"Don't Lie to Me" is a song performed by German singer Lena Meyer-Landrut. The song was released as a digital download on 15 March 2019 as the second single from her fifth studio album Only Love, L (2019). The song peaked at number 30 on the German Singles Chart.

Music video
A music video to accompany the release of "Don't Lie to Me" was first released onto YouTube on 15 March 2019. It was directed by Paul Ripke.

Track listing

Charts

Certifications

Release history

References

2019 songs
Lena Meyer-Landrut songs
Songs written by Lena Meyer-Landrut
Songs written by Jr Blender